Anna Bondár and Lara Salden were the defending champions, but both players chose not to participate.

Amina Anshba and Panna Udvardy won the title, defeating Andrea Gámiz and Eva Vedder in the final, 6–2, 6–4.

Seeds

Draw

Draw

References
Main Draw

Wiesbaden Tennis Open - Doubles